Roland Ramoser (born September 3, 1972) is retired Italian ice hockey player who participated at the 2010 IIHF World Championship as a member of the Italy men's national ice hockey team. Over the course of his career he participated in 17 IIHF World Championship tournaments, 13 in the top division. At the time of his retirement in 2011, Ramoser had participated in the second most World Championships, behind Tommy Jakobsen of Norway. At the age of 18 he went to Canada and played for the Hull Olympiques of the Quebec Major Junior Hockey League and the Kamloops Blazers of the Western Hockey League before going back to Europe.

References

External links

1972 births
Germanophone Italian people
Hull Olympiques players
Ice hockey players at the 1994 Winter Olympics
Ice hockey players at the 1998 Winter Olympics
Italian ice hockey right wingers
Kamloops Blazers players
Vernon Lakers players
Living people
Olympic ice hockey players of Italy
Italian expatriate ice hockey people
Italian expatriate sportspeople in Canada
People from Ritten
Sportspeople from Südtirol